Per Lundh (born April 4, 1958) is a Swedish sprint canoer who competed in the early to mid-1980s. He won a bronze medal in the K-4 500 m event at the 1985 ICF Canoe Sprint World Championships in Mechelen.

Lundh also finished ninth in the K-4 1000 m event at the 1980 Summer Olympics in Moscow.

References

Sports-reference.com profile

1958 births
Canoeists at the 1980 Summer Olympics
Living people
Olympic canoeists of Sweden
Swedish male canoeists
ICF Canoe Sprint World Championships medalists in kayak